is a Japanese anime film produced by Madhouse and directed by Atsuko Ishizuka. It was released in Japan in February 18, 2022.

Plot
When they were children, "Toto" Mitarai and Roma Kamogawa formed their own club, the Don Glees.  When Toto reaches 15, he moves to Tokyo to attend high school.  Toto returns a year later to find Roma longing for his crush, "Tivoli" Urayasu, who has moved away to Ireland.  Toto goads Roma to contact Tivoli, even calling Tivoli long distance to get Roma to talk to her.

Toto also finds that Roma has added a new member to the club, "Drop" Sakuma.  Drop talks Roma into spending all his money to buy a drone.  They will use the drone to film a large professional fireworks display, while setting their own fireworks in a secluded field.  But on the night of the display, they can't get their fireworks to light, and Roma loses the drone.  Some hours later, a wildfire breaks out in the mountains.  The next day, their schoolmates spread rumors that the Don Glees set the fire, based on the police finding their dud fireworks.  The three friends locate their drone, and decide to retrieve it to use its video footage to clear their names.

The drone landed in a place in the mountains so isolated that the kids need to hike overnight to reach it.  To go, they lie about their plans, and dodge investigating police officers and bears.  But they don't make it before sundown, and so settle down near a small waterfall.  Drop tells the others about how everyone should have a "treasure" they should want more than anything else.  He also talks about his time living in Iceland, where he once found a working telephone booth next to a "golden" waterfall.  But he also refers to a stay at the hospital, and asks the others if they would have any regrets if the world ended tomorrow.  Meanwhile, Toto spends all his time panicking about his cram school studies and admonishing his friends' childish behavior.  He even brings a textbook to the hike, as he has an exam the next day.  But he eventually calms down and admits that he's not so sure he wants to become a doctor like his father wishes.  He also tells Drop about the origin of the club name.  The name comes from "Don't glee" in English, referring to how he and Roma never smiled or played with other kids.  Toto eventually adds his textbook to their campfire, no longer caring so much.  Roma figures that Tivoli is his "treasure".  He holds dear a photo of a field with a ladybug that she took with his father's old professional grade camera.

The next day they find the drone and return, only to see that nearly everyone has forgotten about the fire.  But days later, Drop dies.  A devastated Roma destroys the Don Glees clubhouse in grief.  But among the wreckage, they find two bottles of Coca-Cola with a map of Iceland drawn on it.  Drop had drawn this map with an "x" for the telephone booth.  The two friends decide to fly all the way to Iceland to find the booth.  After several days of hiking, they find a gigantic waterfall that they guess is Drop's golden waterfall.  Nearby, they find the phone booth, complete with a working phone.  Toto sees the phone number, and realizes that he called this very number by mistake when he tried to call Tivoli.  They deduce that Drop picked up the phone when they called the wrong number, inspiring him to seek Toto and Roma out.  They also found a note left by Drop describing his treasure as friends who will help him on his last adventure.

Cast

Development and production
The film was first announced in July 2021, where it was revealed the film would be produced by Madhouse, and directed and scripted by Atsuko Ishizuka, with Takahiro Yoshimatsu designing the characters and Kadokawa distributing the film. Yoshiaki Fujisawa will compose the music. The film's main theme song is "Rock the World" performed by Alexandros. The film was released in Japanese theaters on February 18, 2022. In North America, GKIDS acquired the rights to the film and screened it with Japanese and English-language options on September 14, 2022.

Media

Manga adaptation
A manga adaptation, written and illustrated by Shinki, began serialization in Media Factory's Monthly Comic Gene magazine on October 15, 2021. The adaptation completed its serialization on February 15, 2022.

Reception

Accolades

References

External links
  
 

2022 anime films
2021 manga
Anime with original screenplays
Films set in Iceland
Japanese animated feature films
Japanese animated films
2020s Japanese-language films
Madhouse (company)
Media Factory manga
Shōjo manga